Torud may refer to:

Torud, Semnan
Torud, Tehran
Torud Rural District, Semnan Province

See also
1953 Torud earthquake, which struck Semnan Province